NUST may refer to:
Namibia University of Science and Technology, Windhoek, Namibia
Nanjing University of Science and Technology, Nanjing, China
National University of Sciences and Technology, Pakistan
National University of Science and Technology, Zimbabwe
Newcastle United Supporters Trust, an organisation representing fans of Newcastle United Football Club in England
Norwegian University of Science and Technology, Trondheim, Norway
Northeastern Huskies alpine ski team, the collegiate alpine ski racing team representing Northeastern University of Boston, MA

See also
University of Science and Technology (disambiguation)